Handball at the 1987 All-Africa Games was held from August 1–13, 1987 in Nairobi, Kenya. The competition included the men's tournament for the fourth time and the women's tournament for second time.

Events

Men's tournament 

Final standing is:

Women's tournament 

Final standing is:

References

 
Handball at the African Games
All-Africa Games
1987 in African handball